Kanygin is a Russian masculine surname, its feminine counterpart is Kanygina. Notable people with the surname include:

Igor Kanygin (born 1956), Belarusian wrestler
Vladimir Kanygin (1948–1990), Russian weightlifter

Russian-language surnames